William Galloway may refer to:

 Sir William Galloway (mining engineer) (1840–1927), British mining engineer and professor of mining
 William McNaughton Galloway (1840–1895), mayor of Brisbane, Queensland, Australia
 William Wilding Galloway (1854–1936), English businessman in the cotton industry
 William Johnson Galloway (1868–1931), British businessman and Conservative politician
 Hippo Galloway (William Hipple Galloway), American baseball player